Mack Sennett (born Michael Sinnott; January 17, 1880 – November 5, 1960) was a Canadian actor, filmmaker, and studio head, known as the 'King of Comedy'.

Born in Danville, Quebec, in 1880, he started in films in the Biograph Company of New York City, and later opened Keystone Studios in Edendale, California in 1912. Keystone possessed the first fully enclosed film stage, and Sennett became famous as the originator of slapstick routines such as pie-throwing and car-chases, as seen in the Keystone Cops films. He also produced short features that displayed his Bathing Beauties, many of whom went on to develop successful acting careers.

Sennett's work in sound movies was less successful, and he was bankrupted in 1933. In 1938 he was presented with an honorary Academy Award for his contribution to film comedy.

Early life
Born Michael Sinnott in Danville, Quebec, he was the son of Irish Catholic John Sinnott and Catherine Foy. His parents married in 1879 in Tingwick, Quebec and moved the same year to Richmond, Quebec where Sinnott was hired as a laborer. By 1883, when Sennett's brother George was born, Sinnott was working as an innkeeper, a position he held for many years. Sennett's parents had all their children and raised their family in Richmond, then a small Eastern Townships village. At that time, Sennett's grandparents were living in Danville, Quebec. Sennett moved to Connecticut when he was 17 years old.

He lived for a while in Northampton, Massachusetts, where, according to his autobiography, he first got the idea to become an opera singer after seeing a vaudeville show. He said that the most respected lawyer in town, Northampton mayor (and future President of the United States) Calvin Coolidge, as well as Sennett's mother, tried to talk him out of his musical ambitions.

In New York City, he took on the stage name Mack Sennett and became an actor, singer, dancer, clown, set designer, and director for the Biograph Company. A distinction in his acting career, often overlooked, is that he played Sherlock Holmes 11 times, albeit as a parody, between 1911 and 1913.

Keystone Studios

With financial backing from Adam Kessel and Charles O. Bauman of the New York Motion Picture Company, Sennett founded Keystone Studios in Edendale, California – now a part of Echo Park – in 1912. The original main building which was the first totally enclosed film stage and studio ever constructed, is still standing. Many successful actors began their film careers with Sennett, including Marie Dressler, Mabel Normand, Charles Chaplin, Harry Langdon, Roscoe Arbuckle, Harold Lloyd, Raymond Griffith, Gloria Swanson, Ford Sterling, Andy Clyde, Chester Conklin, Polly Moran, Louise Fazenda, The Keystone Cops, Bing Crosby, and W. C. Fields.

Dubbed the King of Hollywood's Fun Factory, Sennett's studios produced slapstick comedies that were noted for their hair-raising car chases and custard pie warfare, especially in the Keystone Cops series. The comic formulas, however well executed, were based on humorous situations rather than the personal traits of the comedian. The various social types, often grotesquely portrayed by members of Sennett's troupe, were adequate to render the largely “interchangeable routines: “Having a funny mustache, or crossed-eyes, or an extra two-hundred pounds was as much individualization as was required.”

Film historian Richard Koszarski qualifies "fun factory" influence on comedic film acting:

Sennett's first female comedian was Mabel Normand, who became a major star under his direction and with whom he embarked on a tumultuous romantic relationship. Sennett also developed the Kid Comedies, a forerunner of the Our Gang films, and in a short time, his name became synonymous with screen comedy which were called "flickers" at the time. In 1915, Keystone Studios became an autonomous production unit of the ambitious Triangle Film Corporation, as Sennett joined forces with D. W. Griffith and Thomas Ince, both powerful figures in the film industry.

Sennett Bathing Beauties 

Also beginning in 1915, Sennett assembled a bevy of women known as the Sennett Bathing Beauties to appear in provocative bathing costumes in comedy short subjects, in promotional material, and in promotional events such as Venice Beach beauty contests. The Sennett Bathing Beauties continued to appear through 1928.

Independent production 

In 1917, Sennett gave up the Keystone trademark and organized his own company, Mack Sennett Comedies Corporation. Sennett's bosses retained the Keystone trademark and produced a cheap series of comedy shorts that were "Keystones" in name only: they were unsuccessful, and Sennett had no connection with them. Sennett went on to produce more ambitious comedy short films and a few feature-length films. During the 1920s his short subjects were in much demand; they featured stars such as Louise Fazenda, Billy Bevan, Andy Clyde, Harry Gribbon, Vernon Dent, Alice Day, Ralph Graves, Charlie Murray, and Harry Langdon. He produced several features with his brightest stars such as Ben Turpin and Mabel Normand.

Many of Sennett's films of the early 1920s were inherited by Warner Bros. Studio. Warner Bros. merged with the original distributor, First National, and added music and commentary to several of these short subjects. Unfortunately, many of the films of this period physically deteriorated to the point of destruction, due to inadequate storage. As a result, many of Sennett's films from his most productive and creative period no longer exist.

Move to Pathé Exchange
In the mid-1920s, Sennett moved to Pathé Exchange distribution. Pathé had a huge market share, but made bad corporate decisions, such as attempting to sell too many comedies at once, including those of Sennett's main competitor, Hal Roach. In 1927, Hollywood's two most successful studios, Metro-Goldwyn-Mayer and Paramount Pictures, took note of the profits being made by smaller companies such as Pathé Exchange and Educational Pictures. MGM and Paramount resumed the production and distribution of short subjects. Hal Roach signed with MGM, but Mack Sennett remained with Pathé Exchange even during hard times, which were brought on by the competition. Hundreds of other independent exhibitors and movie houses of this period had switched from Pathé to the new MGM or Paramount films and short subjects.

Experiments, awards, and bankruptcy

Sennett made a reasonably smooth transition to sound films, releasing them through Earle Hammons's Educational Pictures. Sennett occasionally experimented with color. He was also the first to get a talkie short subject on the market in 1928. In 1932, he was nominated for the Academy Award for Live Action Short Film in the comedy division for producing The Loud Mouth (with Matt McHugh, in the sports-heckler role later taken in Columbia Pictures remakes by Charley Chase and Shemp Howard). Sennett also won an Academy Award in the novelty division for his film Wrestling Swordfish, also in 1932. On March 25, 1932, he became a United States citizen.

Sennett often clung to outmoded techniques, making his early-1930s films seem dated and quaint. This doomed his attempt to re-enter the feature-film market with Hypnotized (starring blackface comedians Moran and Mack, "The Two Black Crows"). However, Sennett enjoyed great success with short comedies starring Bing Crosby, which were more than likely instrumental in Sennett's product being picked up by a major studio, Paramount Pictures. W. C. Fields conceived and starred in four famous Sennett-Paramount comedies. Fields himself recalled that he "made seven comedies for the Irishman"; his original deal called for one film and an option for six more, but ultimately only four were made with Fields as star. Two other Sennett shorts were made with Fields scripts: The Singing Boxer (1933) with Donald Novis and Too Many Highballs (1933) with Lloyd Hamilton.

Sennett's studio did not survive the Great Depression. His partnership with Paramount lasted only one year and he was forced into bankruptcy in November 1933.

On January 12, 1934, Sennett was injured in an automobile accident that killed blackface performer Charles Mack in Mesa, Arizona.

His last work, in 1935, was as a producer-director for Educational Pictures, in which he directed Buster Keaton in The Timid Young Man and Joan Davis in Way Up Thar. (The 1935 Vitaphone short subject Keystone Hotel is not a Sennett production, although it featured several alumni from the Mack Sennett Studios. Actually, Sennett was not involved in the making of this film.)

Mack Sennett went into semiretirement at the age of 55, having produced more than 1,000 silent films and several dozen talkies during a 25-year career. His studio property was purchased by Mascot Pictures (later part of Republic Pictures), and many of his former staffers found work at Columbia Pictures.

In March 1938, Sennett was presented with an honorary Academy Award: "for his lasting contribution to the comedy technique of the screen, the basic principles of which are as important today as when they were first put into practice, the Academy presents a Special Award to that master of fun, discoverer of stars, sympathetic, kindly, understanding comedy genius – Mack Sennett."

Later projects
Rumors abounded that Sennett would be returning to film production (a 1938 publicity release indicated that he would be working with Stan Laurel of Laurel and Hardy), but apart from Sennett reissuing a couple of his Bing Crosby two-reelers to theaters, nothing happened. Sennett did appear in front of the camera, however, in Hollywood Cavalcade (1939), itself a thinly disguised version of the Mack Sennett-Mabel Normand romance. In 1949, he provided film footage for and also appeared in the first full-length comedy compilation called Down Memory Lane (1949), which was written and narrated by Steve Allen. Sennett was profiled in the television series This Is Your Life in 1954, and made a cameo appearance (for $1,000) in Abbott and Costello Meet the Keystone Kops (1955). His last contribution worth noting was to the NBC radio program Biography in Sound relating memories of working with W.C. Fields, which was broadcast February 28, 1956.

Death
Sennett died on November 5, 1960, in Woodland Hills, California, aged 80. He was interred in the Holy Cross Cemetery in Culver City, California.

Filmography

Tributes
For his contribution to the motion picture industry, Sennett was honored with a star on the Hollywood Walk of Fame at 6712 Hollywood Boulevard. He was also inducted into Canada's Walk of Fame in 2014.

In popular culture
In A Story of Water, a 1961 short film by Jean-Luc Godard and François Truffaut, the directors dedicated the film to Mack Sennett.
In 1974, Michael Stewart and Jerry Herman wrote the musical Mack & Mabel, chronicling the romance between Sennett and Mabel Normand.
Sennett also was a leading character in The Biograph Girl, a 1980 musical about the silent film era.
Peter Lovesey's 1983 novel Keystone is a whodunnit set in the Keystone Studios and involving (among others), Mack Sennett, Mabel Normand, Roscoe Arbuckle, and the Keystone Cops.
Dan Aykroyd portrayed Mack Sennett in the 1992 movie Chaplin. Marisa Tomei played Mabel Normand and Robert Downey Jr. starred as Charlie Chaplin.
Joseph Beattie and Andrea Deck portrayed Mack Sennett and Mabel Normand, respectively, in episode eight of series two of ITV's Mr. Selfridge.
Carol Burnett did a lengthy tribute skit to Mack Sennett on her show that aired on Me TV in June 2021.

See also
Canadian pioneers in early Hollywood

Notes

References

Sources
Koszarski, Richard. 1976. Hollywood Directors: 1914-1940. Oxford University Press. Library of Congress Catalog Number: 76-9262. 
Silver, Charles. 2009. Send in the Clowns. AN AUTEURIST HISTORY OF FILM https://www.moma.org/explore/inside_out/2009/12/22/send-in-the-clowns/ Retrieved 3 October 2020.
Sinnott, Michael. 1999. Mack Sennett: Canadian-American director and producer. Encyclopædia Britannica. https://www.britannica.com/biography/Mack-Sennett Retrieved 3 October 2020.
Walker, Brent. 2010. Mack Sennett's fun factory: a history and filmography of his studio and his Keystone and Mack Sennett comedies, with biographies of players and personnel. Jefferson, N.C.: McFarland & Co.; 

Further reading
 Lahue, Kalton (1971) Mack Sennett's Keystone: The man, the myth and the comedies. New York: Barnes;

External links

Mack Sennett at Virtual History
Mack Sennett papers, Margaret Herrick Library, Academy of Motion Picture Arts and Sciences

1880 births
1960 deaths
Male actors from Massachusetts
Academy Honorary Award recipients
American male comedians
American male film actors
American male silent film actors
Anglophone Quebec people
Burials at Holy Cross Cemetery, Culver City
Canadian emigrants to the United States
Film directors from Quebec
Film producers from Quebec
Canadian male silent film actors
Canadian male comedians
American people of Irish descent
Canadian people of Irish descent
People from Estrie
People from Northampton, Massachusetts
Producers who won the Live Action Short Film Academy Award
Slapstick comedians
Silent film directors
20th-century American male actors
20th-century Canadian male actors
Articles containing video clips
American film production company founders
Film producers from Massachusetts
20th-century American comedians
Male actors from Quebec